The 1951–52 NBA season was the Warriors' 6th season in the NBA.

Offseason

Draft picks

Roster

Regular season

Season standings

x – clinched playoff spot

Record vs. opponents

Game log

Playoffs

|- align="center" bgcolor="#ffcccc"
| 1
| March 20
| @ Syracuse
| L 83–102
| Paul Arizin (22)
| Paul Arizin (13)
| Andy Phillip (6)
| Onondaga War Memorial
| 0–1
|- align="center" bgcolor="#ccffcc"
| 2
| March 22
| Syracuse
| W 100–95
| Paul Arizin (29)
| Paul Arizin (10)
| Andy Phillip (9)
| Philadelphia Arena
| 1–1
|- align="center" bgcolor="#ffcccc"
| 3
| March 23
| @ Syracuse
| L 73–84
| Paul Arizin (26)
| Paul Arizin (15)
| Andy Phillip (7)
| Onondaga War Memorial
| 1–2
|-

Player statistics

Season

Playoffs

Awards and records
 Paul Arizin, NBA All-Star Game
 Joe Fulks, NBA All-Star Game
 Andy Phillip, NBA All-Star Game
 Paul Arizin, NBA Scoring Champion
 Paul Arizin, All-NBA First Team
 Andy Phillip, All-NBA Second Team

Transactions

References

See also
 1951–52 NBA season

Golden State Warriors seasons
Phil